Jenna McClure (born 8 May 1981) is a former Australian netball player. She played for Perth Orioles in the Commonwealth Bank Trophy.

References 

1981 births
Living people
Perth Orioles players
Australian netball players
Netball players from Western Australia
Australian accountants